Krasnoyarovo (Qıźılyar) is a rural locality (a village) in Novomedvedevsky Selsoviet, Ilishevsky District, Bashkortostan, Russia. The population was 185 as of 2010. There are 2 streets.

Geography 
Krasnoyarovo is located 34 km north of Verkhneyarkeyevo (the district's administrative centre) by road. Starobiktovo is the nearest rural locality.

References 

Rural localities in Ilishevsky District